Widener can refer to:

Places
 Widener Library, of Harvard University
 Widener University, a private university in Chester, Pennsylvania
 Widener University School of Law, the law school of Widener University
 Widener, Arkansas, a town in St. Francis County, Arkansas, United States

People
Widener (surname), list of people with the surname

See also
 Rhône (The) v. Peter A.B. Widener (The)